Skalak is a village in Ruen Municipality, in Burgas Province, in southeastern Bulgaria.
This village has 620 inhabitants and nearly all of them belong to the  Turkish minority of Bulgaria. There are also a few Pomak families living in this villages.

References

Villages in Burgas Province